The  is a yakuza syndicate based in Tokyo with a predominantly Zainichi Korean membership.

History
The group was formed by Hisayuki Machii, a Zainichi Korean mob boss, as the Tosei-kai in 1948. The Tosei-kai was originally a reported far-right organization of anti-communist activism led by Machii as a sympathizer of Kanji Ishiwara, which was in conflict with the North Korea-associated General Association of Korean Residents in Japan.

The Tosei-kai quickly became one of Tokyo's most powerful gangs, and had significantly expanded during the time of the post-war economic growth. Membership reached 1,500 in the 1960s. As the leader of the syndicate, Machii became an essential "fixer" between Japan and South Korea.

The founder Machii retired in the 1980s, and died of heart failure on September 14, 2002, in Tokyo. Also known as a successful businessman, he was 79.

Condition
The Toa-kai is a member of a bakuto fraternal federation named the Kanto Hatsuka-kai, along with four other Kanto-based yakuza syndicates, the Sumiyoshi-kai, the Inagawa-kai, the Matsuba-kai, and the Soai-kai. The Toa-kai has aligned itself with the largest known Yamaguchi-gumi syndicate since the syndicate's Taoka era in the 20th century, and has been closely supported by Shinobu Tsukasa, the sixth-generation godfather of the Yamaguchi-gumi, since 2005 when the sixth era of the Yamaguchi-gumi officially started.

Territories
The Toa-kai has its headquarters in Ginza, Tokyo ever since its formation. The Toa-kai has its five branch organizations in Tokyo, and one branch organization outside of Tokyo.

Okinawa
The Yoshimi-kogyo is the Toa-kai's only branch organization based outside of Tokyo. Based on the Okinawa island, the Yoshimi-kogyo is one of the three major yakuza groups in the Okinawa region, along with the Kyokuryu-kai and the Okinawa Kyokuryu-kai.

The origin of the Yoshimi-kogyo reportedly traces back to the late 20th century, when Toshio Gibo, an ethnic Okinawan mobster, formed an anti-left nationalist organization named the Makoto-kai in Okinawa under influence of Yoshio Kodama. Gibo met with Machii through Kodama, founding an affiliate of the Tosei-kai in Okinawa.

Okinawa's underworld has been known for its exclusiveness since the 20th century, where the dominating Kyokuryu-kai has persistently attacked and violently expelled any yakuza syndicate attempting to enter the island. The reason why the Toa-kai has been able to be active on the island may be because the group has historically been more oriented to legitimate businesses, and of its gentle stance, in contrast to other yakuza syndicates which have attempted to expand their influences into Okinawa with heavy violence, such as the Yamaguchi-gumi and especially the Dojin-kai. For example, in 2002 in Okinawa, only one Yoshimi member was arrested, while 56 Kyokuryu-kai members and 95 Okinawa Kyokuryu-kai members were arrested.

Leadership

Tosei-kai era
President: Hisayuki Machii
Toa Yuai Jigyo Kumiai era
1st president: Fujimatsu Hirano
2nd president: Morihiro Okita
Toa Yuai era
President: Shohei Futamura
Toa-kai era
1st president: Shohei Futamura
2nd president: Yoshio Kaneumi

References

Organizations established in 1948
1948 establishments in Japan
Yakuza groups
Anti-communist organizations
Yamaguchi-gumi
Zainichi Korean history